Michael F. Kresky Jr. (May 23, 1904 – August 22, 1978) was a member of the Wisconsin State Senate from 1937 to 1939.

Born in Marinette, Wisconsin, Kresky graduated from Georgetown University Law School in 1931 and then practiced law in Green Bay, Wisconsin. In 1940, he was candidate for the United States House of Representatives from Wisconsin's 8th congressional district, losing to incumbent Joshua L. Johns. He was a member of the Wisconsin Progressive Party.

References

Wisconsin state senators
Wisconsin Progressives (1924)
People from Marinette, Wisconsin
Georgetown University Law Center alumni
Wisconsin lawyers
1904 births
1978 deaths
20th-century American politicians
People from Green Bay, Wisconsin
20th-century American lawyers